Avur may refer to:

 Avur, Azerbaijan
 Avur, India